Sundarakanda may refer to:
 Sundara Kanda, the fifth book in the Hindu epic Ramayana
 Sundarakanda (1991 film), 1991 Kannada film starring Shankar Nag
 Sundarakanda (1992 film), 1992 Telugu film starring Daggubati Venkatesh and Meena
 Sundarakanda (2001 film), 2001 Kannada film starring Shivaraj Kumar
 Sundarakanda (2008 film), 2008 Telugu film starring Allari Naresh and Charmy Kaur